The SR Merchant Navy class is a type of steam locomotive, designed by Oliver Bulleid, that ran on the British Southern Railway network.  All were built at the Southern Railway's Eastleigh Works. The following table sets out the names, numbers and other vital statistics of the locomotives that comprised the class.  The 'Merchant Navies' represented a publicity success for the Southern Railway in highlighting the names of Merchant Navy shipping lines that used Southampton Docks, which were served by the Southern Railway.  They also constituted a roving memorial to the seamen who fought at sea during the Second World War to keep Britain supplied with food, fuel and other goods.

The shipping lines below are linked to their current or last owners, and take into account the many mergers that occur in the Merchant Marine industry, for example, General Steam Navigation merged with P & O in 1920, and finally disappeared as a separate entity in 1972.

See also
 SR Merchant Navy Class 35006 Peninsular & Oriental S. N. Co.
 SR Merchant Navy Class 35009 Shaw Savill
 SR Merchant Navy Class 35027 Port Line
 SR Merchant Navy Class 35028 Clan Line

Footnotes

External links 
 Southern e-groupMerchant Navy information
Preserved locomotives
 Peninsular & Oriental S.N. Co (35006)
 General Steam Navigation (35011) 
 Clan Line (35028)

Standard gauge steam locomotives of Great Britain
4-6-2 locomotives
Merchant Navy
Streamlined steam locomotives
Railway locomotives introduced in 1941
British railway-related lists